Rashad Andre Jennings (born March 26, 1985) is an American football running back and coach for the Kingpins of Fan Controlled Football (FCF). He was drafted by the Jacksonville Jaguars in the seventh round of the 2009 NFL Draft. He also played for the Oakland Raiders and the New York Giants. Jennings played college football at Pittsburgh and Liberty.

High school career
Jennings began his high school career at Jefferson Forest High School in his hometown, Forest, Virginia. As a fifth string running back, he didn't play in a game until the last game of his junior year. As a self-described "270 lb. chubby kid with asthma and glasses", Jennings finally played after the first four running backs ahead of him on the depth chart went down with injuries and after his coach attempted to play a wide receiver at running back. On his first handoff he ran the ball in for a 30-yard touchdown. After a 40-yard rushing touchdown and scoring 2 more touchdowns on defense, Jennings was approached by a scout from the University of Tennessee who had come to see the starting running back. After inquiring about his grades and discovering Jennings had a 0.6 GPA, the scout said "Son, you have potential... Get your grades right!"

After the encouragement, Rashad transferred to Lynchburg Christian Academy. His older brothers began coaching at the school the year before. Once enrolled both brothers used their coaching stipends to help pay the tuition since Rashad could not afford it. At LCA, he would begin to shed some weight and take to learning after having to repeat his junior year. In his junior and senior year, he was a two-time All-VISAA Division II selection while totaling 3,287 yards and 56 touchdowns, including 1,978 rushing yards and 33 touchdowns as a senior, while also lettering twice in basketball.

College career
Jennings began his college career at Pittsburgh in 2005, only the fourth true freshman running back to start there. However, Jennings transferred to the then Division I-FCS Liberty, in spring 2006, to be closer to his family. Though Jennings was suspended for the first two games of the 2007 season due to an internal violation, he set a Big South Conference record with 3,633 yards, 42 touchdowns, and averaged 5.7 yards per carry.

On September 26, 2020, the Liberty Flames retired his number 23.

Professional career

Jacksonville Jaguars
After being coached by the Jacksonville Jaguars' staff during the 2009 Senior Bowl, Jennings was drafted by Jacksonville in the seventh round (250th overall) of the 2009 NFL Draft. He scored his first career touchdown in Week 9 against the Kansas City Chiefs, rushing for 28 yards.  After a promising rookie season, Jennings's 2011 season was cut short by injuries after suffering a concussion in the Jaguars' first preseason game, and his knee injury two weeks later, Jennings was placed in injured reserve before the regular season began.

Due to a contract holdout by starter Maurice Jones-Drew, Jennings was named the starting running back for the team's 2012 regular season opener against the Minnesota Vikings. Jones-Drew returned to the starting lineup the following week Jennings resumed his role as a backup until a shoulder injury on December 24, 2012 landed him on injured reserve for the second consecutive year.

Oakland Raiders
Jennings was signed by the Oakland Raiders on April 11, 2013. Jennings started the 2013 season backing up starter Darren McFadden. McFadden spent much of the season on the sideline due to injuries, forcing Jennings to start eight games in his place. Jennings, a career backup, exceeded expectations as a starter and saw his best rushing game of the season in Week 11 against the Houston Texans where he rushed 22 times for 150 yards (6.8 ypc) and one touchdown on an 80-yard rush. Jennings finished the season with 733 rushing yards on 163 carries and six touchdowns.

New York Giants
On March 12, 2014, Jennings signed a four-year, $14 million contract including $3 million guaranteed with the New York Giants. Jennings quickly took over as starter, starting 9 games out of the 11 that he played. Jennings rushed for 639 yards on 167 carries and scored 4 rushing touchdowns.

Jennings started all 16 games in 2015, and set career highs in carries, rushing yards, receiving yards, and receiving touchdowns. Jennings recorded 863 yards along with three touchdowns on 195 carries, as well as 296 yards and one receiving touchdown on 29 receptions. Jennings played his best football later in the season, besting his previous season highs in both carries and yards in each of his final four games, with 79 carries for 432 yards and 2 touchdowns in that stretch.

Jennings played in 13 games in 2016, rushing for 593 yards, his lowest total since 2013, and scored three touchdowns on 181 carries. He added 35 receptions for 201 receiving yards and one receiving touchdown in 2016.

On February 13, 2017, Jennings was released by the Giants.

On December 8, 2017, Jennings announced his retirement from the NFL.

Fan Controlled Football
In early 2022, Jennings would be a coach for the Fan Controlled Football Kingpens. On May 21, 2022, Jennings would play runningback  with the Fan Controlled Football Kingpens.

NFL career statistics

Dancing with the Stars and Acting
On March 1, 2017, Jennings was revealed as one of the contestants who would compete on Season 24 of Dancing with the Stars and was paired with professional dancer Emma Slater. Jennings and Slater went on to win the competition on May 23, 2017.  It was Slater's first win on the competition show and Jennings is the fourth NFL player to win the show.

In November 2017, Jennings returned to 25th season in Week eight, to participate in a trio Cha-cha-cha with Drew Scott and his professional partner Emma Slater.

In May 2018, Jennings returned to the ballroom as guest judge for Week 2 of season 26.

Jennings later returned in season 27 as a trio partner once again to DeMarcus Ware and Lindsay Arnold.

1 Score given by guest judge Nick Carter.2 Score given by guest judge Mandy Moore.

In 2016, Jennings appeared in one episode of the STARZ series, Power, as a guest in the club Truth. Season 3; Episode 10 titled “In My Best Interest”. 

In 2017, Jennings appeared as a contestant on Talk Show the Game Show with Guy Branum.

In 2017, Jennings also appeared in one episode of the NBC series Great News as Portia’s fiancé, Carvell.

In January 2019, Rashad appeared as the guest co-host with Nev Schulman in the MTV show Catfish.

In January 2020, Jennings appeared as a contestant on Guy's Grocery Games - Game Day Super Teams with Guy Fieri.

References

External links

New York Giants bio
Oakland Raiders bio
Jacksonville Jaguars bio
Liberty Flames bio

1985 births
Living people
African-American Christians
American football running backs
Dancing with the Stars (American TV series) winners
Jacksonville Jaguars players
Liberty Flames football players
New York Giants players
Oakland Raiders players
People from Forest, Virginia
Pittsburgh Panthers football players
Players of American football from Virginia
Sportspeople from Lynchburg, Virginia